Rangitoto is a rural community in the Waitomo District and Waikato region of New Zealand's North Island.

Demographics
Rangitoto is in meshblocks 1020500 and 1020600, which had a population of 168 in the 2018 census. It is within the much larger Waipa Valley statistical area.

Marae

The area includes Te Ahoroa Marae, a Ngāti Maniapoto tribal meeting ground of the Maniapoto hapū of Pare and Rereahu and the Rereahu hapū of Ngāti Paretapoko. It includes the Tapairu meeting house.

In October 2020, the Government committed $499,848 from the Provincial Growth Fund to upgrade the marae, creating an estimated 10 jobs.

Education

References

Waitomo District
Populated places in Waikato